Maulana Habibullah Mukhtar (born; 28 April 1944 – 2 November 1997) (Urdu: مولانا ڈاکٹر محمد حبیب اللہ مختار) was a Pakistani Islamic scholar and writer who served as chancellor of Jamia Uloom-ul-Islamia and General secretary of Wifaq ul Madaris Al-Arabia, Pakistan.

Early life and education
Habibullah Mukhtar was born in 1944 to Hakim Mukhtar Hassan Khan in Delhi. At the age of three, he migrated from Delhi to Karachi with his family. He got his early religious education from Darul Uloom Karachi and Dars-i Nizami form Jamia Uloom-ul-Islamia in 1959. In 1966, on the behest of Muhammad Yousuf Banuri he entered to the Islamic University of Madinah and studied there for four years, and returned in 1970. Then he obtained his MA in Islamic Studies in 1973 and his Ph.D. from Karachi University in 1981. At the same time, he continued teaching and practice at Darul Iftaa Jamia Uloom-ul-Islamia.

Career
From the earliest to the last major book of Dars-e-Nizami Sahih Bukhari Sharif, every important book was under his tutelage at Jamia Uloom-ul-Islamia. In 1991, after the demise of Maulana Mufti Ahmad-ur-Rehman, the second chancellor of the Jamia, by mutual consent Maulana Habibullah Mukhtar was given the responsibility. At the same time, the position of the General Secretary of Wifaq ul Madaris Al-Arabia, Pakistan was also vacant. Maulana Habibullah Mukhtar was also elected to take charge of this position.

Literary works
He authored many books and also translated dozens of Arabic books into Urdu.including;

 Bringing up children in Islam
 Yaqeen wa Imaan
 Momin ka Hathyar

Death
Mukhtar was shot dead on 2 November 1997, along with his driver Muhammad Tahir. He was laid to rest in the premises of Jamia Banuri Town next to his Shaykh and mentor Allama Banuri and Mufti Ahmad-ur-Rehman.

References

1944 births
1997 deaths
Jamia Darul Uloom, Karachi alumni
Jamia Uloom-ul-Islamia alumni
University of Karachi alumni
Islamic University of Madinah alumni
Wifaq ul Madaris Al-Arabia people
Pakistani Muslim scholars of Islam
Chancellors of Jamia Uloom-ul-Islamia
Academic staff of Jamia Uloom-ul-Islamia
General Secretaries of Wifaq ul Madaris Al-Arabia